Bolbol or Belbel may refer to:
 Bolbol, East Azerbaijan
 Bolbol, Sistan and Baluchestan